Wilhelm Stoph (9 July 1914 – 13 April 1999) was a German politician. He served as Chairman of the Council of Ministers (Prime Minister) of the German Democratic Republic (East Germany) from 1964 to 1973, and again from 1976 until 1989.  He also served as chairman of the State Council (head of state) from 1973 to 1976.

Biography
Stoph was born in Berlin in 1914; his father died the following year in World War I. In 1928, Stoph joined the Communist Youth League of Germany (Kommunistischer Jugendverband Deutschlands; KJVD) and in 1931 he joined the Communist Party of Germany. He was conscripted into the Wehrmacht from 1935 to 1937, and served during World War II from 1940 to 1945. He was awarded the Iron Cross 2nd Class and rose to the rank of Unteroffizier. As the war ended, according to historian Harris Lentz, "Stoph worked with the Communist-dominated Socialist Unity party and served on the party's executive committee from 1947."

Following the establishment of the GDR in 1949, Stoph became a member of the Central Committee of the Socialist Unity Party of Germany (SED) and member of the Volkskammer in 1950. He was named to the Politbüro in 1953. He served as Interior Minister from 9 May 1952 to 1 July 1955, and as East Germany's first Defense Minister from 18 January 1956 to 14 July 1960. As defense minister, he was awarded the rank of Armeegeneral.

After having served as first deputy chairman of the Council of Ministers (first Deputy Prime Minister) from 1960 to 1964, he was named Chairman of the Council of Ministers (Ministerrat), or Prime Minister, in 1964 after the death of Otto Grotewohl. However, he had been serving as acting chairman of the council since October 1960 due to Grotewohl's poor health. He was initially thought to be the heir apparent to longtime party leader Walter Ulbricht, but his ascendancy was checked by Erich Honecker. After Ulbricht's death in 1973, Stoph became Chairman of the Council of State—a post equivalent in rank to president of the GDR. After Volkskammer elections in 1976, Honecker re-arranged the state and party leadership structure. Believing that Stoph's successor as prime minister, Horst Sindermann, was too liberal on economic matters, Honecker replaced him with Stoph.

During his first stint as Prime Minister, Stoph began a series of negotiations with West German Chancellor Willy Brandt in 1970. It marked the first ever meeting between the leaders of East and West Germany.

Stoph was known as a man who could be trusted to carry out the directives of the SED's Politburo; indeed, Honecker tapped him for his second stint in the premiership for this reason. For the most part, Stoph was a loyal supporter of Honecker. Although he nominally held the highest state post in the GDR, in practice he was outranked by Honecker, who derived most of his power from his post as general secretary of the SED.  

However, Stoph joined the plot to remove Honecker in October 1989.  At the Politburo meeting at which Honecker was voted out, Stoph made the motion to depose Honecker and replace him with Egon Krenz.  A month later, on 13 November, Stoph and his entire 44-member cabinet resigned in response to public pressure. Stoph was subsequently arrested for corruption in December 1989. As part of an attempt to distance itself from its communist roots, the SED's successor, the Party of Democratic Socialism, expelled Stoph in January 1990. He was later spared detention on grounds of ill health. In 1994, a court in Berlin decided that his seized savings of 200,000 Deutsche Mark would not be returned to him.

Stoph died in Berlin at the age of 84 on 13 April 1999 as the last surviving leader of East Germany before Egon Krenz. He was buried in Wildau.

References

|-

|-

|-

|-

1914 births
1999 deaths
Politicians from Berlin
Communist Party of Germany politicians
Members of the Politburo of the Central Committee of the Socialist Unity Party of Germany
Heads of state of East Germany
Prime Ministers of East Germany
Ministers of National Defence (East Germany)
Government ministers of East Germany
Members of the State Council of East Germany
Members of the Provisional Volkskammer
Members of the 1st Volkskammer
Members of the 2nd Volkskammer
Members of the 3rd Volkskammer
Members of the 4th Volkskammer
Members of the 5th Volkskammer
Members of the 6th Volkskammer
Members of the 7th Volkskammer
Members of the 8th Volkskammer
Members of the 9th Volkskammer
German atheists
Red Orchestra (espionage)
Army generals of the National People's Army
German Army soldiers of World War II
German prisoners of war in World War II held by the Soviet Union
Recipients of the Scharnhorst Order
Recipients of the Patriotic Order of Merit (honor clasp)
Heads of government who were later imprisoned
Recipients of the Iron Cross (1939), 2nd class